Brig. Gen. Valere Nka is a Cameroonian general who has commanded Cameroonian soldiers in the Boko Haram insurgency and the Anglophone Crisis. He has also served as Defence Attaché to Nigeria.

In February 2017, Nka was named chief of the 4th Inter-Army Military Region in charge of fighting Boko Haram. The appointment came after the previous chief, General Jacob Kodji, died in a helicopter accident a few days prior. Nka had already been involved in the fight against Boko Haram for some time, and had been second in command for the coalition forces fighting around Lake Chad.

Following his replacement in the north, Nka was deployed to Northwest Region to lead the fight against Ambazonian separatists. In January 2020, he threatened to assassinate several prominent separatist generals if they did not surrender; this ultimatum was followed shortly by the capture and murder of "General Chacha" of the Southern Cameroons Restoration Forces.

Brigadier General Nka Valere of the 5th military region that covers the West and NW regions is responsible for several genocidal attacks against civilians, including women and children in the NW region of Cameroon.

Brigadier General Nka Valere led forces that perpetrated the Ngarbuh massacre in which as many as 22 villagers, including 14 children, were massacred in the anglophone NW region of Cameroon. The United Nations’ James Nunan, a local official with the UN's humanitarian coordination agency OCHA, told AFP news agency that heavily armed Cameroon government Security forces carried out the massacre on Friday, February 14, 2020 in the village of Ntumbo in the Northwest Region. "Up to 22 civilians were killed, including a pregnant woman," Nunan said, adding 14 children - including nine under age five - were among the dead.

Eleven of the children were girls, reported Nunan, head of OCHA's office for the Northwest and Southwest regions, which are home to the Central African country's large English-speaking minority.

What is seen in the Ngarbuh massacre is exactly what Brigadier General Nka’s forces did to Boko Haram in the North of Cameroon where thousands of villagers were summarily executed, including children tied to their mothers. Villages were burnt down and the villagers were chased into the Nigerian and Chadian deserts. Brigadier General Nka Valere has brought the same tactics to the NW region. General Nka is well known for his dynamism. Aside from being an army general, he is also a humanitarian who has assisted hundreds of people in the war-torn regions of Cameroon and constructed, schools, hospitals and pipe born water.

References

https://www.businessincameroon.com/public-management/0202-6861-cameroon-brigadier-general-valere-nka-in-charge-of-fight-against-boko-haram

Living people
Year of birth missing (living people)
21st-century Cameroonian people
African military personnel